Glacial squid is a common name for several squids and may refer to:

Galiteuthis glacialis, a species of glass squid from the Antarctic Convergence
Psychroteuthis glacialis, the only known species in the monotypic genus Psychroteuthis

Squid